Caninia  may refer to:
 Caninia gens, an ancient Roman family
 Caninia (genus), an extinct coral genus in the order Rugosa